Tímea Babos and Andrea Sestini Hlaváčková were the defending champions, but both players chose not to participate. Since Babos was losing her defending championship points, Barbora Krejčíková and Kateřina Siniaková jointly attained the WTA number 1 doubles ranking at the conclusion of the tournament.

Alexandra Panova and Laura Siegemund won the title, defeating Darija Jurak and Raluca Olaru in the final, 6–2, 7–6(7–2).

Seeds

Draw

Draw

References
 Draw

2018 Women's Doubles
Kremlin Cup – Doubles
2018 in Russian women's sport